Houghton Bank is a village in the borough of Darlington and the ceremonial county of County Durham, England. It is situated a few miles west of Newton Aycliffe, on the A68 between Darlington and Bishop Auckland.

References

External links

Villages in County Durham
Places in the Borough of Darlington
Places in the Tees Valley
Heighington, County Durham